Border Ranges can refer to:
 Border Ranges National Park, a national park that is located adjacent to a section of the state border between New South Wales and Queensland, Australia
 Border Ranges (Rocky Mountains), a mountain range of the Rocky Mountains, on the border between Canada and the United States
 Border Rangers is a 1950 western film directed by William Burke